Shri Prakash Shukla was an Indian killer active during the 1990's mainly in the state of Uttar Pradesh (UP). He was killed on 22 September 1998 in an encounter with the UP police's Special Task Force. He was about 25 at the time of his death

Life
Prakash Shukla was born in Mamkhor village, near Hata Bazar, Gorakhpur. He was a son of a retired AIr force personal, who stared Thekedaari in Gorakhpur after returng from airforce. jawan. In 1993, Shukla killed a man called Rakesh Tiwari, for a cable business dispute. However Rakesh Tiwari was shot by mistake. After the incident Shukla was himself guilty for he had not done it intentionally. The family was assured about Shukla's safety by a renowned  politician of Gorakhpur harishanker tiwari. Shukla was sent to Bangkok. After his return he was compelled  to murder Virendra Shahi. Later he became associated with Suraj Bhan of Mokama, Bihar. He was once the most dreaded and ruthless gangster of Uttar Pradesh and North Bihar who created panic among others in the business but no one dared to confront him in his area of influence. He had become the biggest headache for the politicians too who complained to the police department to take urgent action against him.

In early 1997, Shukla killed Virendra Shahi, a politician and a member of the state's underworld, in Lucknow. Shukla started the trend of clearing AK-47 and Carbine magazines by spreading bullets on the enemies. This trend is being followed in Chicago of east (Gorakhpur) till now. It was presumed that Hari Shankar Tiwari, who was an opponent of Virendra Shahi, would be targeted next as Shukla wanted the Chillupar assembly seat. In April 1998, the Uttar Pradesh police formed a  STF to capture or kill 43 top criminals of the state, Shukla was on the list.

On 26 May 1998, Shukla's gang kidnapped Kunal Rastogi, the son of a businessman, from Botanical Gardens, Lucknow. His father was shot dead as he tried to save him. The gang allegedly took 50 million to free the boy. In June 1998, he also allegedly killed Brij Behari Prasad, a minister from Bihar, in a Patna hospital where he was undergoing treatment. Soon after, Sakshi Maharaj, a Member of the Parliament from Farrukhabad, had claimed that Shukla had taken a contract of  million to kill then Uttar Pradesh Chief Minister Kalyan Singh. But, he did not reveal the source of this information.

Death
On 8 and 15 September 1998, episodes about Prakash Shukla were broadcast on the crime show India's Most Wanted. The host of the show, Suhaib Ilyasi, claimed that he got threat calls from Shukla after that. He has also said that he got an anonymous phone call on 10 September 1998 saying Shukla and his associates had been seen in a blue Daewoo Cielo near AIIMS Delhi. On 21 September, another anonymous caller said that Shukla and his associates had been seen in Ghaziabad in a blue Daewoo Cielo. The tips were forwarded to the Delhi and Uttar Pradesh police.

On 22 September 1998, Shukla was shot dead by the Uttar Pradesh police's Special Task Force (STF), outside an apartment complex in Ghaziabad. Shukla was hiding in the Vasant Kunj area of Delhi. He had come to Ghaziabad to visit his girlfriend. He was on his way to the Palam airport presumably to escape to Ranchi, where his arms-dealer Suraj Bhan lived. By this time, the task force, which was formed in April, had spent 10 million in the investigation and had flown 1,00,000 km between Patna, Lucknow and Delhi trying to track him down. He was tracked down primarily by his mobile phone. He used to change SIM cards but he had used one number more than other for a week. The mobile phone and diary recovered after the shootout provided evidence of his connections to politicians.

After death
After his death, the STF found that Shukla was connected to various politicians, his godfather and protector was madhumita fame amarmani,  members of Mayawati government,   and some politicians had provided him shelter. Some had taken money from Shukla in exchange for these favours. On 5 November 1998, Pritam Singh, a member of the STF, was shot dead by members of Shukla's gang.

In popular culture
 In 2005, a film, Sehar, based on the STF's work which killed Shukla was released. The character based on Shukla was played by Sushant Singh.
 In 2010, a TV series, Gunahon Ka Devta, was broadcast. One of the characters was based on Shukla.
 Zee5's Rangbaaz first session is based on Shukla's character played by Saqib Saleem.

References

Contract killers
Indian murderers
1998 deaths
Criminals from Uttar Pradesh
Year of birth missing
Indian gangsters